Chimborazo is a province in the central Ecuadorian Andes. It is a home to a section of Sangay National Park. The capital is Riobamba. The province contains  Chimborazo (6,267 m), Ecuador's highest mountain.

Cantons 
The province is divided into 10 cantons. The following table lists each with its population at the time of the 2010 census, its area in square kilometres (km2), and the name of the canton seat or capital.

Town's in the province include Cacha.

Demographics 
Ethnic groups as of the Ecuadorian census of 2010:
Mestizo  58.4%
Indigenous  38.0%
White  2.2%
Afro-Ecuadorian  1.1%
Montubio  0.3%
Other  0.1%

See also 
 Cantons of Ecuador
 Provinces of Ecuador
 Chimborazo volcano
 Sangay National Park
 Opportunitas aequa

References

External links 

  Gobierno de la Provincia de Chimborazo, official website
  Radio Mundial Riobamba
 Chimborazo area map

 
Provinces of Ecuador